Jose Michael Romero (born 1 August 1971 in Chile), is a former Australian rules footballer.

Romero, who was recruited from Jacana, played in the VFL/AFL for both the North Melbourne FC and Western Bulldogs.

Romero's family immigrated to Australia from Chile when he was aged 7. His father is a distant cousin of St Oscar Romero of El Salvador.

Debuting in 1987 with the Kangaroos, Romero played 109 games for the club before moving to the Western Bulldogs, debuting in 1995.

Romero, known during his career for his fitness and endurance, still holds the AFL beep test record of 17.1.

Injury meant that the 1996 Charles Sutton Medallist (the Best and Fairest Award for the Bulldogs) was forced to retire during the 2001 season. Romero served a stint as the club runner for the Bulldogs, as well as previously being part of the club's football department and serving as a member of the board.

References

External links
Jose Romero profile at AustralianFootball.com

1971 births
Living people
VFL/AFL players born outside Australia
North Melbourne Football Club players
Western Bulldogs players
Victorian State of Origin players
Charles Sutton Medal winners
Australian rules footballers from Victoria (Australia)
Jacana Football Club players
Chilean emigrants to Australia
Australian people of Chilean descent
Sportspeople of Chilean descent
Australia international rules football team players